Los Angeles City Hall, completed in 1928, is the center of the government of the city of Los Angeles, California, and houses the mayor's office and the meeting chambers and offices of the Los Angeles City Council. It is located in the Civic Center district of downtown Los Angeles in the city block bounded by Main, Temple, First, and Spring streets, which was the heart of the city's central business district during the 1880s and 1890s.

The Observation Deck or Tom Bradley Tower located on the 27th floor is open to the public. Access to City Hall is located off of Main St. The rotunda is located on the 3rd floor accessible by all elevators. To access the Tom Bradley Tower requires the “Express Car Only” for floors 1, 3, and 10 through 22 elevators. Once on the 22nd floor transition to the Gold 22 thru 26 elevator bank. Finally once on the 26th floor, access to the 27th can be reached by stairs or one more elevator. Public restrooms are located on the 3rd and 26th floor.

History

The building was designed by John Parkinson, John C. Austin, and Albert C. Martin, Sr., and was completed in 1928. Dedication ceremonies were held on April 26, 1928. The concrete in its tower was made with sand from each of California's 58 counties and water from its 21 historical missions. City Hall's distinctive tower was based on the shape of the Mausoleum of Mausolus, and shows the influence of the Los Angeles Public Library, completed shortly before the structure was begun. An image of City Hall has been on Los Angeles Police Department badges since 1940.

Therefore, from its completion in 1928 until 1964, the City Hall was the tallest building in Los Angeles, and shared the skyline with only a few structures having decorative towers, including the Richfield Tower and the Eastern Columbia Building.

City Hall has an observation deck, free to the public and open Monday through Friday during business hours. The peak of the pyramid at the top of the building is an airplane beacon named in honor of Colonel Charles A. Lindbergh, the Lindbergh Beacon. Circa 1939, there was an art gallery, in Room 351 on the third floor, that exhibited paintings by California artists.

The building was designated a Los Angeles Historic-Cultural Monument in 1976.

In 1998 the building was closed during a total $135 million refurbishment which also included upgrading it so it could withstand a magnitude 8.2 earthquake including permitting it to sway in a quake.

Previous City Halls

Prior to the completion of the current structure, the L.A. City Council utilized various other buildings:

 1850s: used rented hotel and other buildings for city meetings
 1860s: rented adobe house on Spring Street—across from current City Hall (now parking lot for Clara Shortridge Foltz Criminal Justice Center)
 1860s–1884: relocated to Los Angeles County Court House
 1884–1888: moved to Mirror Building at South Spring Street and West 2nd Street (site of current Los Angeles Times Building)
 1888–1928: moved to new Romanesque Revival building on 226-238 South Broadway between 2nd Street and 3rd Street; demolished in 1928 and now site of parking lot between LA Times parking structure and 240 Broadway. Beams from the building ended up repurposed in the construction of writer Frank Scully's 1936 Mediterranean Revival home at 2071 Grace Ave, in the Whitley Heights neighborhood of Los Angeles.

Usage

The Mayor of Los Angeles has an office in room 300 of this building. Every Tuesday, Wednesday and Friday at 10:00am, the Los Angeles City Council meets in its chamber. 

An observation level is open to the public on the 27th floor.  The interior of this floor, comprises a single large and highly vaulted room distinguished by the iconic tall square columns that are far more familiar as one of the building's most distinguishing exterior features.  The Mayor Tom Bradley Room, as this large interior space is named,  is used for ceremonies and other special occasions.

City Hall and the adjacent federal, state, and county buildings are served by the Civic Center station on the LA Metro B Line (Red) and D Line (Purple). The J Line (Silver Line) stops in front of the building.

The Los Angeles Dodgers wore a commemorative uniform patch during the 2018 season celebrating 60 years in the city depicting a logo of Los Angeles City Hall.

Filming location

The building has been featured in the following popular movies and television shows:

 While the City Sleeps (1928): The newly constructed building appears in the background of some exterior shots in this silent crime drama starring Lon Chaney, even though the film is set in New York.
 Adventures of Superman: The building appears as the Daily Planet building beginning in the second season of the 1950s TV series. At the time the TV program was broadcast, the show's Daily Planet building (Los Angeles City Hall) was frequently confused with the similarly designed Pennsylvania Power & Light Building in Allentown, also built in 1928.  Additionally, the exact design of this building is used as the Newstime magazine headquarters in the Superman comic books.
 Alias: A CIA black ops unit is located behind a maintenance door at Civic Station.
 Dragnet: The building appears as itself in the TV series. The first episode of Dragnet (1951) Season 1, Episode 1: "The Human Bomb", original air date 16 December 1951, was filmed at Los Angeles City Hall. It was embossed on Sgt. Joe Friday's famous badge number 714 that was displayed under the credits.
 Perry Mason: The City Hall building appears in the view from Perry's office window. This has led viewers of the show to speculate where the fictional office would have been located in downtown Los Angeles.
 L.A. Confidential: The police in the 1997 neo-noir film operate out of the City Hall, as well as the police badges featuring a depiction the building itself. At the time the film takes place no building in Los Angeles was allowed to be taller than City Hall, so the cameras were placed at certain points so that any building taller than City Hall would not be seen.
 Tower of Terror: In this 1997 made-for-TV movie, the main character's love interest works at a fictional newspaper, The Los Angeles Banner. The newspaper's logo is based on the top of City Hall.
 Adam-12: During the seventh season opening credits montage, City Hall is shown directly at the end, as the building that officers Reed and Malloy drive away from. It is also shown on the embossed badges numbered 744 (Malloy) and 2430 (Reed).
 The 2003 Dragnet series used the L.A. City Hall building aerial shot and badge throughout its introduction.
 War of the Worlds: The City Hall was destroyed (albeit by miniature) in the 1953 film version (although the H. G. Wells book has the aliens attacking London, the setting was changed to Los Angeles for the film).
 V: City Hall was destroyed when the Visitors attack Earth. The same footage of the tower being destroyed from War of the Worlds was used but with different energy weapons superimposed.
  The 1976 film The Bad News Bears included a scene both shot and set in the city council chamber that included a close-up of the electronic voting board with the names of the incumbent council members.
 The 1991 music video for Prince's "Diamonds and Pearls" features City Hall as the primary location.
 AFI's music video for their 2006 song "Miss Murder" was filmed at City Hall.
  The 2011 film Atlas Shrugged: Part I.
  The 2011 series Torchwood: Miracle Day used the main entrance of City Hall to represent the CIA archive Esther Drummond visits in "The New World", and the exterior to the medical conference where Vera Juarez meets Jilly Kitzinger in "Rendition"/"Dead of Night".
 The 2013 film The Employer uses City Hall as the headquarters of the fictional Carcharias Corporation.
 The 2013 film Gangster Squad features the Los Angeles City Hall, with the members of the Gangster Squad stood in the foreground of the building, as well as it being used in the background of some scenes. Mayor Villaraigosa's conference room was also used for the office of Police Chief Parker.
 The Amazing Race 25: City Hall appeared during the season finale with teams having to bring a film permit to the building.

Gallery

City Hall South

City Hall South at 111 E. First Street, on the north side of First Street between Los Angeles and Main streets, built in 1952-4, architects Lunden, Hayward & O'Connor, International Style, originally opened as the City Health Building, housing health offices, clinics, and labs, and a central utility plant that heated City Hall proper and Parker Center (then police headquarters).

City Hall East

City Hall East, 200 N. Main St., is located in the South Plaza of the Los Angeles Mall, a sunken, multi-level series of open spaces and retail space on the east side of Main Street straddling Temple Street. It is an 18-story,  Brutalist, 1972 building by Stanton & Stockwell, featuring a mural by Millard Sheets, The Family of Man.

See also

Regional Connector
Base isolation
Earthquake engineering
Grand Park
International Savings & Exchange Bank Building
Los Angeles Times Building
Clara Shortridge Foltz Criminal Justice Center

References

External links

 History of and guide to Los Angeles City Hall—with maps and photos

City halls in California
City Hall
Buildings and structures in Downtown Los Angeles
Government buildings in Los Angeles
City Hall
Downtown Los Angeles
Los Angeles Historic-Cultural Monuments
Skyscraper office buildings in Los Angeles
Government buildings completed in 1928
John and Donald Parkinson buildings
Art Deco architecture in California
Streamline Moderne architecture in the United States